Concetto Lo Bello  (13 May 1924 – 9 September 1991) was an Italian association football international referee.
He holds the record for refereeing the most games in Serie A (328).

His career spanned the years 1944 to 1974, refereeing his first international match in 1958.

He officiated at 34 international matches, including the West Germany–USSR semi-final in 1966. He had been provisionally chosen to referee the 1970 FIFA World Cup Final, but the Italian team reached the final, so he could not officiate.

Lo Bello also refereed the European Cup finals of 1968 and 1970, as well as the Inter-Cities Fairs Cup 2nd leg final in 1966 and the UEFA Europa League 2nd leg final in 1974.

After retirement, he entered politics, as a deputy for the Christian Democrat party.
He was Minister of Sport for a spell, and, briefly, was Minister for Drought.
In 1986, he was elected mayor of Syracuse, but was only in the job for five months.
In 2012, he was posthumously inducted into the Italian Football Hall of Fame.

References

1924 births
1991 deaths
Italian football referees
FIFA World Cup referees
People from Syracuse, Sicily
1966 FIFA World Cup referees
1964 European Nations' Cup referees
Sportspeople from the Province of Syracuse
Christian Democracy (Italy) politicians